Jerome A. Katz is an American professor, consultant and author who specializes in entrepreneurship. He is the Robert H. Brockhaus Endowed Chair of Entrepreneurship at Saint Louis University in St Louis, Missouri and Director of the Billiken Angels Network.

Education
Katz attended Rhodes College in Memphis earning a BA in psychology. His PhD in organizational psychology from the University of Michigan was awarded in 1981.

References

Living people
Writers from Memphis, Tennessee
University of Michigan alumni
Saint Louis University faculty
Rhodes College alumni
University of Memphis alumni
Wharton School of the University of Pennsylvania faculty
21st-century American writers
20th-century American writers
20th-century American male writers
Year of birth missing (living people)